Anthony Preston may refer to:

Anthony Preston (record producer), American music producer and songwriter
Antony Preston (naval historian) (1938–2004), British naval historian and editor
A television actor, whose credits include a featured appearance in the UK television series Juliet Bravo
A fictional character in the film Midnight Lace
Anthony Preston, 11th Viscount Gormanston